Prasophyllum secutum, commonly known as the northern leek orchid, is a species of orchid endemic to Tasmania. It has a single tubular, green leaf and up to thirty scented, light brown flowers with a whitish labellum. It is only known from 18 populations and the total population is estimated to number fewer than 500 plants.

Description
As with other leek orchids, the flowers are inverted so that the labellum is above the column rather than below it. There is a fleshy green, channelled callus in the centre of the labellum and extending past the bend. The callus is covered with small papillae. Flowering occurs in October and November but only after fires the previous summer.

Taxonomy and naming
Prasophyllum secutum was first formally described in 1998 by David Jones from a specimen collected on Anthony Beach near Smithton and the description was published in Australian Orchid Research. The specific epithet (secutum) is a Latin word meaning "followed" referring to this species flowering more prolifically after fire.

Distribution and habitat
The northern leek orchid grows in dense coastal scrub between sand dunes. It is found in northern Tasmania and on some of the islands in Bass Strait.

Conservation
The total number of mature plants of P. secutum is difficult to estimate because they only flower after fire and many populations have not been observed for several decades. About 250 plants are known from two populations and the total number in all populations is estimated to be about 500. The main threats to the species are land clearing, habitat disturbance, inappropriate fire regimes and small population size.

References

External links 
 

secutum
Flora of Tasmania
Endemic orchids of Australia
Plants described in 1998